The 1988 German Grand Prix was a Formula One motor race held on 24 July 1988 at the Hockenheimring, Hockenheim. It was the ninth race of the 1988 Formula One World Championship.

The 44-lap race was won from pole position by Ayrton Senna, driving a McLaren-Honda, with teammate Alain Prost second and Gerhard Berger third in a Ferrari. The win, Senna's fifth of the season, moved him to within three points of Prost at the top of the Drivers' Championship.

Report

Pre-race
At the midpoint of the season, the pre-qualifiers were re-evaluated. After a fourth-place finish in the Detroit Grand Prix, the Rial of Andrea de Cesaris was promoted to the top 26 cars automatically entered into the main qualifying sessions. Relegated to pre-qualifying was the Osella of Nicola Larini.

Qualifying
Qualifying saw Ayrton Senna take his seventh pole position of the season by just under 0.3 seconds from McLaren teammate Alain Prost. Gerhard Berger was third in his Ferrari, albeit over a second behind Prost, with teammate Michele Alboreto fourth, a further second behind. Nelson Piquet took fifth in his Lotus, with Alessandro Nannini sixth in his Benetton, the highest-placed non-turbo car. The Marches of Ivan Capelli and Maurício Gugelmin took seventh and tenth respectively, sandwiching Satoru Nakajima in the second Lotus and Boutsen in the second Benetton.

Race
There had been thunderstorms all weekend. The rain stopped on Sunday morning, but there were concerns over which type of tyre to use for the race. In the end, everyone started on wet tyres with the exception of Piquet, who gambled on the track drying out.

At the start, Senna led away while Prost dropped behind Berger and a fast-starting Nannini. Piquet's gamble failed to pay off as he aquaplaned off the track at the Ostkurve chicane and hit the barriers, limping back to the pits to retire. Prost re-passed Nannini on lap 8, while on lap 9 Philippe Alliot, who had pitted for slick tyres, spun his Lola off at the Ostkurve while allowing Senna to lap him. Prost overtook Berger for second on lap 12, but by then Senna was 12 seconds ahead.

Senna and Prost maintained their 1-2 until the chequered flag, despite a late spin by the Frenchman coming out of the Ostkurve. It was Senna's fifth win of the season, as well as the sixth 1-2 for McLaren; the Brazilian thus moved within three points of Prost in the Drivers' Championship.

Berger and Alboreto finished third and fourth respectively. Berger's podium finish was to be the last achieved by the Ferrari team during Enzo Ferrari's lifetime, as he died three weeks later. Nannini was running fourth when he had to pit seven laps from the end due to a broken throttle bracket, losing four laps as a result; a charge brought him the fastest lap of the race, though he still finished only 18th. Capelli inherited fifth despite having no clutch for the last 30 laps, while Boutsen took the final point for sixth.

Mansell retired from seventh with a spin after a broken bolt had jammed his gearbox. Bernd Schneider achieved his first Grand Prix finish in his home race, coming home 12th, which turned out to be the highest finish of the season for the Zakspeed team.

Classification

Pre-qualifying

Qualifying

Race

Championship standings after the race

Drivers' Championship standings

Constructors' Championship standings

References

German Grand Prix
German Grand Prix
German Grand Prix
German Grand Prix